National Highway 313 (NH 313) is a National Highway in North East India that connects Meka, near Roing and Anini in Arunachal Pradesh. It is a spur road of National Highway 13.  NH-313 traverses the state of Arunachal Pradesh in India. This highway connects remotely located town of Anini, which is the headquarter of Dibang Valley district.

Route 
NH313 starts from its junction with NH-13 near Meka and terminates at Anini.

Junctions  

  Terminal near Meka.

See also
 List of National Highways in India
 List of National Highways in India by state

References

External links 

 NH 313 on OpenStreetMap

National highways in India
National Highways in Arunachal Pradesh